In mathematics, a Klingen Eisenstein series is a Siegel modular form of weight k and degree g depending on another Siegel cusp form f of weight k and degree r<g, given by a series similar to an Eisenstein series. It is a generalization of the Siegel Eisenstein series, which is the special case when the Siegel cusp form is 1.

Definition
Suppose that f is a Siegel cusp form of degree r and weight k with k > g + r + 1 an even integer. The Klingen Eisenstein series is

 

It is a Siegel modular form of weight k and degree g. 
Here Pr is the integral points of a certain parabolic subgroup of the symplectic group, and Γr is the group of integral points of the degree g symplectic group. The variable τ is in the Siegel upper half plane of degree g. The function f is originally defined only for elements of the Siegel upper half plane of degree r, but extended to the Siegel upper half plane of degree g by projecting this to the smaller Siegel upper half plane.

The cusp form f is the image of the Klingen Eisenstein series under the operator Φg−r, where Φ is the Siegel operator.

References

Automorphic forms